The U.S city of San Antonio, Texas has a vivid and diverse music scene and population with a large demand for live music. There are large venues such as the AT&T Center,  medium-sized venues such as The Paper Tiger that host large concerts and well-known touring music acts, and many small venues that host many kinds of music.

 502 Bar
 Alamodome
 AT&T Center
 Aztec Theatre
 Bond's 007
 Charline McCombs Empire Theatre
 Cowboy's Dance Hall
 Fitzgerald's Bar & Live Music
 Freeman Coliseum
 Hard Rock Cafe - San Antonio
 Hemisfair Park
 Hi Tones
 K23
 The Korova
 The Limelight
 Majestic Theatre
 The Mix
 Paper Tiger (formerly The White Rabbit)
 Phantom Room
 Sam's Burger Joint
 San Antonio Music Hall (formerly Backstage Live)
 Six Flags Fiesta Texas
 Sunken Garden Theater
 Sunset Station
 The Ten Eleven
 Tobin Center for the Performing Arts (formerly Municipal Auditorium)
 VFW Post #76
 Zombies

See also
 List of concert venues

References

Music venues
San Antonio
Tourist attractions in San Antonio
Music of San Antonio
San Antonio
Music venues
Venues